The Big Blue (released in some countries under the French title Le Grand Bleu) is a 1988 drama film in the French Cinéma du look visual style, made by French director Luc Besson. It is a heavily fictionalized and dramatized story of the friendship and sporting rivalry between two leading contemporary champion free divers in the 20th century: Jacques Mayol (played by Jean-Marc Barr) and Enzo Maiorca (renamed "Enzo Molinari" and played by Jean Reno), and Mayol's fictionalized relationship with his girlfriend Johana Baker (played by Rosanna Arquette).

The film became one of France's most commercially successful films (although an adaptation for US release was a commercial failure in that country). French President Jacques Chirac referred to the film in describing Mayol, after his death in 2001, as an enduring symbol for the "Big Blue" generation.

The story was heavily adapted for cinema. In real life, Mayol lived from 1927 to 2001 and Maiorca retired from diving to politics in the 1980s. Both set no-limits-category deep diving records below 100 metres, and Mayol was indeed involved in scientific research into human aquatic potential, but neither reached  as portrayed in the film, and they were not direct competitors. Mayol himself was a screenwriter for the film, and Mayol's search for love, family, "wholeness" and the meaning of life and death, and the conflict and tension between his yearning for the deep and his relationship with his girlfriend are also major elements of the latter part of the film.

Plot
Two children, Jacques Mayol and Enzo Molinari, have grown up on the Greek island of Amorgos in the 1960s. Enzo challenges Jacques to collect a coin on the sea floor but Jacques refuses. Later, Jacques' father—who harvests shellfish from the seabed using a pump-supplied air hose and helmet—goes diving. His breathing apparatus and rope gets caught and punctured by rocks on the reef and weighed down by water, he drowns. Jacques and Enzo can do nothing but watch in horror as he is killed.

By the 1980s, both are well known freedivers, swimmers who can remain underwater for great times and at great depths. Enzo is in Sicily now, where he rescues a trapped diver from a shipwreck. He is a world champion freediver with a brash and strong personality, and now wishes to find Jacques and persuade him to return to no-limits freediving in order to prove he is still the better of the two, in a friendly sports rivalry. Jacques himself works extensively with scientific research as a human research subject, and with dolphins, and is temporarily participating in research into human physiology in the iced-over lakes of the Peruvian Andes, where his remarkable and dolphin-like bodily responses to cold water immersion are being recorded. Insurance broker Johana Baker visits the station for work purposes and is introduced to Jacques. She secretly falls in love with him. When she hears that Jacques will be at the World Diving Championships in Taormina, Sicily, she fabricates an insurance problem that requires her presence there, in order to meet him again. She and Jacques fall in love. However, none of them realize the extent of Jacques' allurement with the depths. Jacques beats Enzo by 1 metre, and Enzo offers him a crystal dolphin as a gift, and a tape measure to show the small difference between Jacques' and Enzo's records. Johana goes back home to New York but is fired after her deception is discovered; she leaves New York and begins to live with Jacques. She hears the story that if one truly loves the deep sea, then a mermaid will appear at the depths of the sea, and will lead a diver to an enchanted place.

At the next World Diving Championships, Enzo beats Jacques' record. The depths at which the divers are competing enter new territory and the dive doctor suggests they should cease competing, but the divers decide to continue. Jacques is asked to look at a local dolphinarium where a new dolphin has been placed, and where the dolphins are no longer performing; surmising that the new dolphin is homesick, the three of them break in at night to liberate the dolphin and transport her to the sea again. Back at the competition, other divers attempt to break Enzo's new record but all fail. Jacques then attempts his next dive and reaches , breaking Enzo's world record. Angered by this, Enzo prepares to break Jacques' new world record. The doctor supervising the dive warns that the competitors must not go deeper—based upon Jacques' bodily reactions, at around 400 feet conditions and, in particular, the pressure, will become lethal and divers will be killed if they persist in attempting such depths. Enzo dismisses the advice and attempts the dive anyway, but is unable to make his way back to the surface. Jacques dives down to rescue him. Enzo, dying, tells Jacques that he was right and that it is better down there, and begs Jacques to help him back down to the depths, where he belongs. Jacques is grief-stricken and refuses, but after Enzo dies in his arms, finally honors his dying wish and takes Enzo's body back down to 400 feet, leaving him to drift to the ocean floor. Jacques—himself suffering from cardiac arrest after the dive—is rescued and brought back to the surface by supervising scuba divers and requires his heart to be restarted with a defibrillator before being placed in medical quarters to recover.

Jacques appears to be recovering from the diving accident, but later experiences a strange hallucinatory dream in which the ceiling collapses and the room fills with water, and he finds himself in the ocean depths surrounded by dolphins. Johana, who has just discovered she is pregnant, returns to check up on Jacques in the middle of the night, but finds him lying awake yet unresponsive in his bed with bloody ears and a bloody nose. Johana attempts to help him, but Jacques begins to get up and walk to the empty diving boat and gets suited up for one final dive. Desperately, Johana begs Jacques not to go, saying she is alive but whatever has happened at the depths is not, but he says he has to. She tells Jacques that she is pregnant, and sorrowfully begs him to stay, but finally understands he feels he must go. The two embrace and Johana breaks down crying. Jacques then places the release cord for the dive ballast in her hand, and—still sobbing—she pulls it, sending him down to the depths he loves. Jacques descends and floats for a brief moment staring into the darkness. A dolphin then appears and Jacques lets go of his harness and swims away with it into the darkness.

Original and alternate (US) endings
The original ending was intentionally ambiguous, though considering the depth Jacques has swum to, it would seem he is unlikely to regain the surface alive, and he dies. In the American adaptation, the ending is extended with an additional scene: after swimming away with the dolphin, Jacques is returned to the surface.

Cast
 Rosanna Arquette as Johana Baker
 Jean-Marc Barr as Jacques Mayol
Bruce Guerre-Berthelot as Young Jacques Mayol
 Jean Reno as Enzo Molinari
Gregory Forstner as Young Enzo Molinari
 Paul Shenar as Dr. Laurence
 Sergio Castellitto as Novelli
 Jean Bouise as Uncle Louis
 Marc Duret as Roberto
 Griffin Dunne as Duffy
 Andreas Voutsinas as Priest
 Valentina Vargas as Bonita
 Kimberley Beck as Sally
 Patrick Fontana as Alfredo
 Alessandra Vazzoler as La Mamma, Enzo's Mother
 Geoffroy Carey as Supervisor
 Claude Besson as Jacques' Father
 Luc Besson as Blond Diver (uncredited)
 Paul Herman as Taxi Driver In U.S.A

Comparison with real life
The film was heavily fictionalized. In real life, the two were indeed champions and contemporaries. However, they did not directly compete, neither reached 400 feet, and neither died while diving.

Mayol was indeed involved in scientific research into human aquatic potential, and was fascinated by dolphins, and was recorded as having a heartbeat that slowed from 60 to 27 beats per minute when diving. He held numerous world records, including dives to below 100 metres. After a bout of depression, he killed himself in 2001, long after the film's release.

Maiorca (renamed as "Enzo Molinari" in the film) also set numerous depth records from 1960 to 1988, despite involuntarily retiring from the sport for over a decade between 1974 and 1986 after an outburst on TV cost him a competition ban. He entered politics in the 1990s, and became a member of the Italian Senate for a time. For many years, he resisted public showing of the film in Italy, as he considered it to caricature him poorly; after Mayol's death in 2001, he relented and accepted the showing of the film.

Production
Besson was initially unsure of whom to cast in the main role of Mayol. He initially offered the role to Christopher Lambert and Mickey Rourke and even considered himself for the role until someone suggested Jean-Marc Barr. Besson has a cameo appearance as one of the divers in the film. The Big Blue was the most financially successful French film of the 1980s, selling 9,193,873 tickets in France alone, and played in French theaters for a year.

With its extensive underwater scenes and languid score (as with nearly all of Besson's films, the soundtrack was composed by Éric Serra), the film has been both praised as beautiful and serene, and in equal measure criticized as being too drawn out, overly reflective and introspective. While popular in Europe, the film was a commercial failure in North America. The American version was recut to include a simplified "happy" ending, and Serra's score was replaced with a soundtrack composed by Bill Conti. This version was only available on VHS and LaserDisc in the United States (both with 4×3 pan-and-scan transfers) and is currently out of print. The director later released a longer director's cut on DVD, featuring the original ending and an extended version of the Serra score.

Much of the film was shot on the Greek island of Amorgos, where Agia Anna and the monastery of Panagia Hozoviotissa can be seen. The film was dedicated to his daughter Juliette Besson, who required surgery after becoming ill during filming.

Filming locations
Maisons-Laffitte (France), piscine municipale (opening scene in swimming pool)
Chattanooga, Tennessee, United States
Maganari, Ios, Cyclades, Greece 
Agia Anna, Amorgos, Cyclades, Greece
Kalotaritissa bay, Amorgos, Cyclades, Greece
Marineland (Antibes), Antibes, Alpes-Maritimes, France
Peru
St. Croix, U.S. Virgin Islands
Taormina, Messina, Sicily, Italy
Lac du Chardonnet, Tignes, Savoie, Rhône-Alpes, France (lake diving under the ice in Peru)
Cádiz, Spain

Reception
The film was met with positive reviews in Europe, where it was described as "one of the most significant cult movies of the 1980s" by French Cinema historian Rémi Lanzoni, who described it as "ooz[ing] with a sensuous beauty unlike any other film at the time".

The film was slightly edited for US release to have a new, positive ending and the original score was also replaced.

The US release was met with above average reviews. The film aggregator, Rotten Tomatoes gave it 62%, based on 21 reviews, stating that: Though this [film] features beautiful cinematography, it drags on, being way too overblown and melodramatic.

Kevin Thomas of the Los Angeles Times, praised its cinematography, but warned viewers to "be prepared to want to come up for air only minutes into [the film]", referring to the film's pointless plot.

Awards
The Big Blue was nominated for several César Awards and won César Award for Best Music Written for a Film (Éric Serra) and Best Sound in 1989. The film also won France's National Academy of Cinema's Academy Award in 1989.

The film was screened out of competition at the 1988 Cannes Film Festival.

Home media
The film was released on DVD on 21 July 2009.

A Blu-ray version containing both the extended and theatrical versions was released on September 14, 2009, in the United Kingdom, but this contains French-dubbed versions of both cuts, rather than the original English language. This was later corrected and the second release contained a LPCM 2.0 English soundtrack and a DTS 2.0 French dub. The French Blu-ray release contains only the Director's Cut of the film but with a French DTS-MA 5.1 soundtrack and is supplemented with Besson's Atlantis documentary on Blu-ray as well.

In popular culture
A poster for the film can be seen in the photo studio in the 1992 South Korean film The Moon Is... the Sun's Dream.

In the 2009 Japanese anime series Eden of the East, Akira plays the film in his villa's cinema for Saki, who was a big fan. The title of the episode, "On the Night of the Late Show", is a reference to this scene.

See also
Cinema of France
List of French-language films
No-limits apnea – the type of freediving portrayed in the film

References

External links

Le Grand Bleu press release pictures by the 20th Century Fox Film Corporation

Freediving
1988 films
Italian drama films
French drama films
Films directed by Luc Besson
Films scored by Éric Serra
1980s adventure films
1980s romance films
English-language French films
English-language Italian films
Films scored by Bill Conti
Films set in 1965
Films set in the 1980s
Films set in Greece
Films set in Sicily
Films set in the Mediterranean Sea
Films shot in Greece
Films shot in Peru
Films shot in Corsica
Films shot in the United States Virgin Islands
Films featuring underwater diving
Films set in amusement parks
Gaumont Film Company films
Columbia Pictures films
Weintraub Entertainment Group films
Amorgos
1980s Italian films
1980s French films